Harur taluk is a taluk in the Dharmapuri district of the Indian state of Tamil Nadu. The headquarters of the taluk is the town of Harur.

Demographics
According to the 2011 census, the taluk of Harur had a population of 240,357 with 122,216  males and 118,141 females. There were 967 women for every 1000 men. The taluk had a literacy rate of 61.63. Child population in the age group below 6 was 13,903 Males and 12,865 Females.

List of villages in Harur Taluk
Annamalaippatti
Achalvadi
Agraharam
Agraharam
Alambadi
Ammapettai
Andipatti
Andipatti
Andiyur
Appiyampatti
Avallur
Avlampatti
Bairnayakkampatti
Bannikulam
Battalahalli
Bodinaickenhalli
Chandrapuram
Chellampatti
Chettikuttai
Chinnakoundampatti
Chinnapannimaduvu
Dasirihalli
Dodampatti
Elavadai
Ellepudayampatti
Ettipatty
Ganapathipatti
Gettupatti
Gobinathampatti
Gudalur
Harur (TP)
Ichampadi
Ilaiyampatti
Ittaiampatti
Ittalapatti
Jadaiyankombai
Jangalvodi
K. Vetrapatti
Kadambarahalli
Kalladipatti
Kalladipatti
Kambalai
Kammalampatti
Kongavembu
Karapadi
Kattiripatti
Kattur
Kattavadichampatti
Kavaipatti
Kelapparai
Kilanur
Kilchengampadi
Kilmorappur
Kiraipatty
Kodamandapatti
Konampatti
Kondampatti
Kondayampatti
Kosapatty
Kothanampatti
Kottapatti Extension R.F.
Kottapatti
Kottapatti R.F.
Kottarapatti
Kudumiyampatti
Kulunthambinatham
Kumrampatti
Kurumbapatti
Kurumbapatti
Kurumbatti
Karuthampatti
Kuttipatti
M.Vetrapatti
Mambadi
Mampatty
Mandikulampatti
Mangalapatti
Marudipatti
Mattiyampatti
Mattiyampatti
Maveripatti
Meithangi
Melachengambadi
Melanur
Mettuvalasai
Mobirippatti
Mondukuli
Mookanurpatti
Morappur
Morasapatti
Mottayampatti
Mugilipatti
Nachanampatti
H.Nachanampatty
Nadupatti
Naripalli
Nariyampatt
Navalai
Nayinakavundampatti
Neruppandalkuppam
Obilinayakkanpatti
Pachanampatty
Palaiyam
Palayam
Palayampalli
Pallipatti
Panamarathupatti
Pappinayakkenvalasai
Pariayapatti
Periyapatti
Periyappannimaduvu
Ponneri
Poyyapatti
Pudinattam
Pudur
Purakkal Uddai
Rasalampatti
Reddipatti
Ramapuram
Runganavalasai
Sakkilipatti
Samanattam
Samandahalli
Sandappatti
Sekkampatti
Selambai
Sengandipatti
Sennampatti
Senrayampatti
Setrapatti
Sikkalur
Singilipatty
Sittilingi
Sittilingi R.F.
Sittilingi Extension R.F.
Soorapatti
Soriyampatti
Sundangipatti
Suramatham
Tadaravalasai
Tamaleripatti
Tamarakoliyampatti
Tambal
Tandekuppam
Tariasal 
Thadampatti
Thambichettipatti
Thanippadi
Thathampatti
Thedampatti
Theerthamalai
Theerthamalai R.F.
Thekkanampatti
Thippampatti
Thoppampatti
Thoranampatti
Vadapatti
Vadugapatti
Valaduppu
valaithottam(rural site)
Vallimadurai
Vedakadamaduvu
Vedapatti
Velampatti
Velampatti
Velanur
Venakkampatti
Vengiampatti
Veppampatti Extension R.F.
Veppampatti RF
Veppanatham
Veppasennampatti
Virappanayakkampatti

References

Taluks of Dharmapuri district